ʿAbd Allāh ibn al-Mubārak (726–797 CE; Arabic: عبد الله بن المبارك)  was born during the reign of Hisham ibn Abd al-Malik. ‘Abdullah ibn Mubarak was a pious Muslim known for his memory and zeal for knowledge.  He collected hadīth (muhaddith) and was remembered for his asceticism. He earned the title Amir al-Mu'minin fi al-Hadith.  His father, named Mubarak, was from Khurasan and became a client (mawālī) of an Arab trader from the tribe of Banī Hanẓala in the city of Hamadhān. His mother was said to have been from Khwārizm. Mubarak later married Hind, a trader's daughter.  It is said that ‘Abdullah ibn Mubarak left his hometown of Merv, and while living in Hamadhān, went on to visit and speak often in Baghdād. Imam Ahmad commented that there was no one more eager to travel to seek knowledge than Abdullah ibn Mubarak. His teachers included Sufyān al-Thawrī and Abū Hanīfa.  He wrote Kitāb al-Jihād, a collection of hadīth and sayings of the early Muslims on war, and Kitāb al-Zuhd wa al-Rāqa’iq, a book on asceticism. He was also known for defending Islamic borders (see Ribat) on the frontiers of Tarsus and al-Massisah. He died at Hīt, near the Euphrates, in 797 CE during the reign of Harun al-Rashid.

Works
Described as a prolific writer, his works, most are now lost, include:
Kitab al-Arba'een –  آﺘبﺎ اﻷرﺑﻌﻴﻦ 
Kitab al-Jihad –  آﺘبﺎ اﻟﺠﻬدﺎ 
Kitab al-Isti'dhan –  آﺘبﺎ اﻻﺳﺘﺌﺬنا
Kitab al-Birr & al-Silah –  آﺘبﺎ اﻟﺮﺒ واﻟﺼﺔﻠ (Book on the virtues of piety, etiquettes and keeping ties)
Kitab al-Tarikh –  آﺘبﺎ اﻟﺘﺎرﻳﺦ (Book on History)
Kitab al-Daqa'iq fi al-Raqa'iq –  آﺘبﺎ اﻟﺮﻗﺎﺋﻖ ﻲﻓ اﻟﺮﻗﺎﺋﻖ (Book on the heart-softeners)
Kitab Riqa' al-Fatawa –  آﺘبﺎ رﻗعﺎ اﻟﻔﺘﺎوى (Book on Islamic verdicts)
Kitab al-Zuhd & al-Raqa'iq –  آﺘبﺎ اﻟﺰهﺪ واﻟﺮﻗﺎﻖﺋ 
Kitab al-Sunan fil-Fiqh –  آﺘبﺎ اﻟﺴﻨﻦ ﻲﻓ اﻟﻔﻘﻪ
Kitab al-Musnad –  آﺘبﺎ اﻟﻤﺴﺪﻨ
Kitab Tafsir al-Qur'an – آﺘبﺎ تفسير القرآن

References

Hanafi fiqh scholars
Hadith scholars
Taba‘ at-Tabi‘in hadith narrators
Sunni imams
Atharis
Sunni Muslim scholars of Islam
Sunni Sufis
Muslim ascetics
People from Mary Region
8th-century jurists
726 births
797 deaths